Loren Lester (born October 4, 1960) is an American screen, stage and voice actor best known as the voice of DC Comics superhero Dick Grayson/Robin/Nightwing in Batman: The Animated Series and The New Batman Adventures. He is also a graduate of the Occidental College theatre department and has appeared in over 100 radio and television commercials.

Career

Film and television
He began his career very young; one of his early recurring roles was "Roy" in The Facts of Life. He also provided the voice for Rick Gordon, Flash Gordon's son, in the 1986 cartoon series Defenders of the Earth and as Barbeque on G.I. Joe: A Real American Hero.

In 1990, he provided the voice for Jordan Knight in New Kids on the Block. In 1994, he was also the voice of Gringo in the Don Bluth film Thumbelina.

He also played one of the hall monitors, Fritz Hansel, in Rock 'n' Roll High School.

From 1992 to 1999, Lester voiced Dick Grayson / Robin / Nightwing in the DC Animated Universe, appearing primarily in Batman: The Animated Series and it's revamped follow-up The New Batman Adventures. He later reprised the role in the 2017 direct-to-video, Batman and Harley Quinn.

Lester has appeared in over 200 episodes of series including Parenthood, Bones, NCIS, Ringer, Good Luck Charlie, Curb Your Enthusiasm, Awake, The Closer, Desperate Housewives, Cold Case, Criminal Minds, Castle, Two and a Half Men, and many others.

He recurred on all three seasons of the HBO hit comedy series Hung, and had recurring roles on Victorious (Nickelodeon), Gilmore Girls, General Hospital, The Bold and the Beautiful and The Young and the Restless.

Lester also appeared in the Star Trek: Deep Space Nine episode "The Quickening". He was the Irate passenger in Red Eye. In 2008, Lester played the role of an ER doctor on Heroes in the episode "The Second Coming".

His voice has been heard in numerous critically acclaimed audio books and in popular interactive games such as Halo 4 and Batman: Arkham Knight. He provides the voice of Kirk Langstrom and his counterpart Man Bat for Batman: Arkham Knight.

Lester also voiced Hal Jordan / Green Lantern in "The Eyes of Despero" episode of Batman: Brave and the Bold, also from DC Comics. And then the voice of Iron Fist in Ultimate Marvel vs. Capcom 3 and The Avengers: Earth's Mightiest Heroes from Marvel Comics. 
Recently, he directed the web series Let’s Do Lunch, starring  Sam Harris and  Barry Williams.

Stage
Lester has starred in dozens of plays and musicals. He is seen frequently in the Los Angeles theatre scene and recently made his debut at The Pasadena Playhouse in Noël Coward’s Fallen Angels. He has also starred in productions at such venues as the Odyssey Theatre Ensemble, the Santa Monica Playhouse and West Coast Ensemble.

Lester also wrote the stage show  It’s Magic – The Life and Music of Doris Day.

Personal life
Lester and his wife, Kelly, also an actress and daughter of Peter Mark Richman, have three daughters: Jenny, Lily, and Julia.

Filmography

Television 
 5 Weeks in a Balloon (TV Movie)
 Young Love, First Love (TV Movie) 
 Midnight Offerings (TV Movie) 
 Gimme a Break! - Arnie
 Charles in Charge - Clarence Norman
 Falcon Crest - Anesthesiologist
 The Facts of Life - Roy
 The Legend of Prince Valiant - Messenger/Survivor
 Swat Kats: The Radical Squadron - Guard 
 Bonnie - Joe The Toe
 Star Trek: Deep Space Nine - Attendant
 Boomtown
 Good Morning, Miami 
 Without a Trace
 The Practice 
 Las Vegas
 LAX
 General Hospital - Meyer
 Scrubs
 Gilmore Girls - Anson
 Joey
 Desperate Housewives - Dr. Baker
 Two and a Half Men
 The West Wing - Jarin
 Pepper Dennis 
 The Suite Life of Zack and Cody
 The Game - Dr. Joe
 Help Me Help You - Gabe the Mohel
 The Bold and the Beautiful - Eli
 7th Heaven - Bob Meyers
 The Riches 
 In Case of Emergency - Dr. Green
 Notes from the Underbelly
 State of Mind
 Side Order of Life
 Zoey 101
 Unhitched 
 Greek
 The Closer - Dan Frye
 Heroes
 Criminal Minds
 Castle - Mr. Simmons
 Flashforward
 Cold Case 
 Curb Your Enthusiasm
 The Young and the Restless - Dr. Jasper
 Undercovers - Hans
 Dating in the Middle Ages - Dr. James Brownhill
 Victorious - Dr. Levinson 
 Ringer - Aubrey Zimmerman
 Hung - Howard Koontz
 Awake - Murray 
 NCIS - Dr. Edgar Cromwell
 Final Witness
 Good Luck Charlie - Randy
 Help for the Holidays
 Bones
 Reinventing Cassie (TV Movie) 
 Parenthood

Television (animated)

Film 

 Rock 'n' Roll High School - Fritz Hansel
 Evilspeak - Charlie Boy
 Prayer of the Rollerboys - Anchorman
 Ping!
 The Sweetest Thing 
 American Wedding 
 Red Eye 
 Midnight Clear - Gordon
 True Men 
 17 Again - Mike's Lawyer
 After the Wizard - Dr. Edwards 
 Hit List - Billy Joe Philbin
 A Green Story 
 Bigfoot: The Lost Coast Tapes
 A Leading Man 
 A Country Christmas 
 Damn Foreigners
 Chicanery
 Senior Love Triangle - David

Film (animated)

Video games

Shorts 

 The Old Man and the Studio
 Cross-Eyed Dinner Theater Presents! - Alan 
 The One Who Got Away
 Going Home 
 Down, Up, Out 
 Peter at the End 
 Red
 The Interrogation
 The Uncivil War 
 Up the Valley and Beyond
 A Family of Clowns
 Max
 Terrorists Anonymous

References

External links

 

1960 births
Living people
American male soap opera actors
American male stage actors
American male video game actors
American male voice actors
Occidental College alumni
20th-century American male actors
21st-century American male actors